Charles F. Stewart  is an American businessman and is known for his role as the chief executive officer of Sotheby’s. Stewart was the former co-president and chief financial officer of Altice USA.

Early life and education
Stewart majored in history and received a bachelor's degree from Yale University. He went into investment banking after graduation upon seeing a former classmate working at an investment company with financial relationships in Brazil.

Career
In 1996, Stewart helped to open Morgan Stanley’s first Latin American office in Brazil. Stewart was involved with the international IPO of Unibanco and the privatization of Telebras during the 19 years he worked at Morgan Stanley.

On June 24, 2013, Stewart was appointed chief executive officer of Itaú BBA International, the corporate investment bank of the Itaú Unibanco group.

In 2015, Stewart was named co-president and chief financial officer of Altice USA after Patrick Drahi closed a $9.1 billion deal to acquire 70% of St. Louis-based cable operator Suddenlink. Stewart oversaw Altice’s initial public offering, raising $1.9 billion for the company.

In 2019, Stewart became the chief executive officer for Sotheby’s, another Drahi owned company.

Stewart serves on the Prep for Prep's board of trustees and the Coalition for College's board of directors.

Personal life
Stewart is married and has 3 children. Stewart has a home in the Hamptons.

References 

Year of birth missing (living people)
Living people
American chief executives
Yale University alumni
Sotheby's people